Alphonse Emile Alfred Dieudonné, called simply  Dieudonné, (12 January 1834 in the 1st arrondissement of Paris  - 1922 in Paris), after one of the longest careers of the French scene.

Life 
He travelled extensively throughout his life, both in Parisian theatres and in the provinces and even abroad.

He made his debut in Lisbon in 1856, then followed Rachel on one of her tours in the United States. On his return to France, he played for a while at the Théâtre de l'Ambigu, then moved on to the Théâtre du Gymnase until 1864. During this period, he appeared in two plays by Labiche, alongside  : * , comedy in four acts by Labiche, created on 10 September 1860 (part of Armand); and La Poudre aux yeux, comedy in 2 acts by Labiche, created on 19 October 1861 (part of Frédéric).
(part of Léon, also alongside of Jean-Marie Geoffroy).
He then played for twenty years at the Théâtre du Vaudeville, and ended his career flitting between multiple Parisian theatres.

In 1860, he married Victoire Eugénie Blancan born in the 5th arrondissement of Paris on 14 December 1831, an actress herself and also the daughter of actors, who made her entire career by following her husband in the same places (Paris, St. Petersburg, etc.) and in the same theatres. She probably died around 1896.

They had two daughters including Alphonsine Eugénie (born 15 January 1860) in Paris who also became an actress under the name of Miss Déa Dieudonné. Her very short career was abruptly interrupted at Cannes on 24 February 1896. In that year, father and daughter had obtained an engagement at the city casino, where they had brilliant success. One evening, she came home happy after the performance, went to bed and fell asleep. The next day, she was discovered dead in her bed. Her funeral was held at the Russian Church in Paris.

The actress  (1887-1980) was his natural daughter. He did not recognize her until 1916.

Dieudonné died in Paris at the age of 88.

Repertoire 

 1875 : Madame Lili by Marc Monnier, Théâtre du Vaudeville
 1885: Clara Soleil by Edmond Gondinet and Pierre Sivrac, Théâtre du Vaudeville
 1887: Monsieur de Morat by Edmond-Joseph-Louis Tarbé des Sablons: Liliane by Félicien Champsaur and Léopold Lacour, Théâtre du Vaudeville
 1905: Bertrade by Jules Lemaître, Théâtre de la Renaissance
 1906: Les Passagères by Alfred Capus, Théâtre de la Renaissance
 1908 : La Femme nue by Henry Bataille, Théâtre de la Renaissance
 1908: L'Émigré by  Paul Bourget, Théâtre de la Renaissance
 1909: Un ange by Alfred Capus, Théâtre des Variétés  
 1912:  by Sacha Guitry, Théâtre du Vaudeville

References 

Male actors from Paris
19th-century French male actors
1834 births
1922 deaths